Ernest Leonard Johnson (1891–1977) was a South African astronomer and a former staff member of the Union Observatory in Johannesburg, South Africa. He is known for the discovery of 18 asteroids between 1946–1951, as well as several comets. On 25 August 1949, he discovered 48P/Johnson, a periodic comet expected to pass no closer than 1.2 to 1.3 AU from our planet in 2025. Johnson received the "Donohoe Comet Medal" twice before retiring in 1956. He died in 1977.

Biography 
Johnson was the son of William Johnson, a medical practitioner, and Rachel Sarah Joan Sanderson. He matriculated at Grey College, Bloemfontein, South Africa and started working on a mine but when his brother, Cecil Robert Johnson, was killed in a mining accident he applied for a position at the Union Observatory in Johannesburg, South Africa. He started work there as a learner astronomer in 1914.

He served in the armed forces of the Union of South Africa in World War I (1914-1918) during the campaign in German West Africa (now Namibia) but was sent home owing to illness. He recovered and went to England where he served as a bomber pilot for the Royal Flying Corps. After the war he returned to the Union Observatory and remained there for the rest of his career.

Johnson produced star maps of the sky south of 19 degrees south declination, in collaboration with Harry Edwin Wood. In January 1935 he discovered a faint comet, that was visible for less than two months, while searching the sky in declination 52 degrees south. This comet was named Johnson's comet 1935. He discovered a second comet in 1948.

Between August 1946 and July 1951, Johnson also discovered 18 asteroids, the most important of which was named 1580 Betulia. This asteroid was discovered on 22 May 1950 during its close approach to the earth. From 1921 to 1953, his observations of the asteroids and more than 30 comets were published in the Circular of the Union Observatory, Johannesburg.

Johnson was a member of the Astronomical Society of Southern Africa and contributed to the society's Monthly Notes.

List of discoveries

Comets 
Discoveries of comets include:
 C/1935 A1 on 8 January 1935 (Comet a 1935)
 C/1948 R1 on 1 September 1948 (Comet 1948 j)
 48P/Johnson on 25 August 1949
 C/1949 K1 on 20 May 1949 (Comet 1949 a and/or 1949 d)

Asteroids 
Johnson is credited by the Minor Planet Center with the discovery of 18 asteroids:.

Private life 
In 1922 Johnson married Aisleen Devenish, with whom he had a daughter and a son. He retired from the observatory in December 1951 but continued to work until 1956,  during which time he tested potential astronomical sites with portable reflecting telescopes for the European Southern Observatory Organisation.

See also

References 
Vermeulen, D.J. (2006) Living amongst the stars at the Johannesburg Observatory. Johannesburg: Chris van Rensburg Publications

External links 
 Biographical Index to MNASSA and JASSA Prepared by I S Glass in 2003 (archived on 4 February 2012)
 A history of comet discovery from South Africa, T P Cooper, August 2003

1891 births
1977 deaths
Discoverers of asteroids

South African astronomers
South African scientists